Matthew Anthony Berkeley (born 3 August 1987) is a footballer who plays as a forward. Born in England, he made two appearances for the Saint Kitts and Nevis national team in 2011.

Club career
Born in Manchester, Berkeley began his career with Gretna. He spent nine games on loan at Conference North side Workington in 2006. He made his debut for Workington on 4 February 2006. He scored his first goals of the loan period, netting a hat-trick against Northwich Victoria at Borough Park on 18 February. It was announced before Workington's trip to Northwich on 23 March that he would return to Gretna to help their Scottish Cup campaign. He finished his loan spell by scoring the opening goal of the game, although Workington eventually lost 4–1. He was released by Gretna in 2007.

After his release, he joined Altrincham but was released in late September 2007 after only three games for the club.

On 4 October 2007, he re-signed for Workington. He scored his first goals since returning to the club on a permanent basis, scoring two in a 5–0 win over Stalybridge in the FA Cup third qualifying round on 13 October. He moved to Droylsden on 22 June 2008 to join up with manager David Pace, But a month later he joined Leigh Genesis. After a change in management in late October 2008, he left Leigh and joined up with joined up with Mossley before signing for Hyde United the following month.

Berkeley then signed for Welsh Premier League side The New Saints in the 2009 January transfer window and went on to score 3 goals in 13 games in his first season.

He re-joined Hyde in August 2011 after a successful trial. He made his debut for Hyde in a 2–1 opening day win against Worcester City.

In March 2012 he re-joined Workington.

He signed for Colwyn Bay in June 2012. In February 2013 he re-joined Droylsden .

He joined Stafford Town F.C in 2013 but later left to join Stafford Rangers in January 2014.

International career
At the youth level he played in the 2007 CONCACAF U-20 Championship, scoring against Costa Rica and Jamaica.

In September 2011 he was called up to the Saint Kitts and Nevis national team for their 2014 FIFA World Cup qualifiers against St Lucia and Puerto Rico. He made his debut in November 2011 against Canada.

References

External links
 
 
 Matthew Berkeley TNS stats

1987 births
Living people
Citizens of Saint Kitts and Nevis through descent
Saint Kitts and Nevis footballers
Association football forwards
Saint Kitts and Nevis under-20 international footballers
Saint Kitts and Nevis international footballers
Footballers from Manchester
English footballers
Gretna F.C. players
Altrincham F.C. players
Workington A.F.C. players
Droylsden F.C. players
Leigh Genesis F.C. players
Mossley A.F.C. players
Hyde United F.C. players
The New Saints F.C. players
Colwyn Bay F.C. players
Stafford Rangers F.C. players
Stafford Town F.C. players
Cymru Premier players
English people of Saint Kitts and Nevis descent